Taladah ( also spelled Tell Adah) is a village in Syria, administratively part of Idlib Governorate. Nearby localities include Turmanin to the southeast, al-Dana to the southwest and Darat Izza to the northeast. According to the Syria Central Bureau of Statistics (CBS), Talaadah had a population of 5,599 in 2004.

Taladah contains a large Byzantine-era monastery celebrated until the Middle Ages. In 400 CE, St. Simeon Stylites started his ascetic career there. Taladah remained a relatively important Christian site following the Muslim conquest of Syria in the 630s. A Syriac inscription dating to 941 was discovered among the ruins. Taladah was captured by the Crusaders under Tancred in 1104.

Notes

References

Bibliography

Archaeological sites in Idlib Governorate
Populated places in Harem District